Kradikhino is a rural locality (a village) in Yenangskoye Rural Settlement, Kichmengsko-Gorodetsky District, Vologda Oblast, Russia. The population was 39 as of 2002.

Geography 
Kradikhino is located 78 km southeast of Kichmengsky Gorodok (the district's administrative centre) by road. Michino is the nearest rural locality.

References 

Rural localities in Kichmengsko-Gorodetsky District